Mort pour la France (French for "died for France") is a legal expression in France and an honor awarded to people who died during a conflict, usually in service of the country.

Definition 

The term is defined in L.488 to L.492 (bis) of the Code des pensions militaires d'invalidité et des victimes de guerre. It applied to members of the French military forces who died in action or from an injury or an illness contracted during the service during the First and Second World Wars, the Indochina and Algeria Wars, and fighting in Morocco and the Tunisian War of Independence, and to civilians killed during these conflicts. Both French citizens and volunteers of other citizenship are eligible to honor.

Administration 
The words "Mort pour la France" records on the death certificate.

The status is awarded by
 minister responsible for veterans and victims of war, or
 minister responsible for the merchant marine, or
 state minister responsible for national defense.

Additionally diploma «Aux morts de la grande guerre, la patrie reconnaissante» is awarded to family of
 military man of land or navy forces, who died during First World War, or
 military man of land, navy or air forces, or member of Free France / Fighting France (Forces françaises libres, FFL / Forces françaises combattantes, FFC), French Forces of the Interior (Forces françaises de l'Intérieur, FFI), or the French Resistance, who died during Second World War.

Diploma is awarded by minister responsible for veterans and war victims.

Copyright 
French copyright law gives a special 30 years extension of copyright to creative artists declared "Mort pour la France" over the usual 70 years post mortem (article L. 123-10).

Writers 
List of writers officially declared "Mort pour la France".

 Alain-Fournier (1914)
 Jacques Arthuys (1943)
 Guillaume Apollinaire (1918)
 Victor Basch (1944)
 Pierre Brossolette (1944)
 Benjamin Crémieux (1944)
  (1914)
 Jacques Decour (1942)
  (1944)
 Robert Desnos (1945)
 Luc Dietrich (1944)
 Benjamin Fondane (1944)
 Maurice Halbwachs (1945)
 Max Jacob (1944)
 Régis Messac (1945)
 Léon de Montesquiou (1915)
 Irène Némirovsky (1942)
 Georges Politzer (1942)
 Charles Péguy (1914)
 Louis Pergaud (1915)
  (1914)
 Antoine de Saint-Exupéry (1944)
  (1915)
  (1915)
 Georges Valois (1945)
  (1945)
 Jean de la Ville de Mirmont (1914)
 Jean Zay (1944)
Raymond Naves (fr) (1944)

Composers 
List of composers officially declared "Mort pour la France".
 Jehan Alain (1940)
 Joseph Boulnois (1918)
 Émile Goué (1946)
 Fernand Halphen (1917)
 Maurice Jaubert (1940)
 René Vierne (1918)

Others 
Others officially declared "Mort pour la France".
 Georges Peignot (1915)

See also
 List of French villages destroyed in World War I

References

External links 
 Attribution rules (French) on www.defense.gouv.fr
 Mémoire des Hommes Official web site

Law of France
French copyright law
Military history of France
Death in France
French words and phrases
French war casualties